Andrés Rafael Granier Melo (born March 5, 1948 in Villahermosa, Tabasco) is a Mexican politician affiliated with the Institutional Revolutionary Party  who in 2006 successfully ran for governor of Tabasco. He is married to Teresa Calles Santillan and they have twin daughters Mariana and Paulina Granier Calles, and a son, Fabian Granier Calles.

Political career
From 2000 to 2003 Andrés Granier served as municipal president (mayor) of Centro a municipality in Tabasco that has its municipal seat in Villahermosa, the capital city of the state. In 2006 he ran for the governorship of Tabasco; he won the 2006 Tabasco gubernatorial election hence he was elected to serve from 2007 to 2012.

The Coalition for the Good of All and its candidate César Raúl Ojeda questioned the results of the election before the Federal Electoral Tribunal. The Electoral Tribunal annulled the results of seven polling stations on December 27, 2006, but ratified the triumph of Granier, and declared that the Coalition for Good of All failed to show that there were any irregularities.

Granier completed his term as governor in December 2012.

On June 14, 2013, Granier was arrested on charges of corruption and embezzlement of public funds. He has denied wrongdoing. On June 26, 2013, he was taken to jail in Mexico City for tax fraud and money laundering for more than 1,900,000,000 Mexican pesos.

On May 8, 2019, the former governor received a sentence of absolute freedom by a judge, after five years in prison and several months of house arrest.

See also
2006 Tabasco state election
List of municipal presidents of Centro Municipality, Tabasco

References

1948 births
Living people
Politicians from Tabasco
People from Villahermosa
Institutional Revolutionary Party politicians
Municipal presidents in Tabasco
Governors of Tabasco
Mexican people of French descent
Mexican politicians convicted of crimes